Paul Bellini (born September 12, 1959) is a Canadian comedy writer and television actor best known for his work on the comedy series The Kids in the Hall and This Hour Has 22 Minutes. He has worked on several projects with Josh Levy and Scott Thompson, and has appeared in small parts on television shows and films.

The Kids in the Hall 
Paul Bellini attended York University in 1978, where he met Scott Thompson, later to become a member of The Kids in the Hall. For the troupe's eponymous TV series, which ran from 1988 to 1995, Bellini served as Thompson's writing partner. He received several Gemini Award, Emmy Award and CableACE Award nominations as part of the show's writing team. During the same era, Bellini and Thompson also collaborated in a queercore band called Mouth Congress.

Bellini's on-screen presence in The Kids in the Hall began when CBC Television suggested that the troupe conduct some form of sweepstakes in order to determine the makeup of the show's fanbase. Turning down such conventional ideas as a free show taping or a cash prize, the members of KITH decided that the "prize" would be Paul Bellini in a towel. Thus the "Touch Paul Bellini" contest was born, wherein the winner was granted the chance to gently poke the betoweled Bellini with a stick. This sweepstakes would be recreated by HBO, the show's American broadcaster, with winner Rebecca Klatka of St. Petersburg, Florida poking Bellini with a kitchen utensil. During the fourth season, Mike Szabo won a breakfast with him at the Ottawa airport after winning the "Spot Bellini" contest: to win, a viewer had to draw how Bellini appeared in a particular sketch (namely, emerging from a box of condoms). During these and other appearances on the show, Bellini would wander into a sketch wearing nothing but a towel and never speaking, thus himself becoming an absurd character in the show. At the end of the final episode, however, after the cast is buried alive during the end credits, Bellini approaches their grave, turns to the camera, and intones, "Thank God that's finally over." He then picks up a flower and proceeds to dance on their grave.

Founded in 1989, the Paul Bellini Fan Club quickly outgrew the Kids in the Hall fan club. The Paul Bellini Fan Club was based in Montreal, with smaller chapters in Winnipeg, Kitchener, Toronto, Abbotsford, Halifax, New York, Utah and parts of Europe. His fans travelled to Toronto to attend tapings of the Kids in the Hall with homemade "We Love Paul Bellini" signs. When the Shadowy Men on a Shadowy Planet (the band who recorded the show's theme song) came to play in cities where the Bellini fans lived, they brought gifts or home baking for the band members to deliver back to him in Toronto. The club also recorded more than 20 covers of popular songs with modified lyrics that were distributed among members and sung at the Paul Bellini music festival in 1993. The group hosted a Bellini Bratwurst Bar-be-que, produced regular newsletters, and a video depicting a fanciful re-enactment of Bellini's early life. At one event, Bellini brought a bag full of Timmins souvenirs as thank you gifts for his loyal fan club.

He was subsequently a writer for This Hour Has 22 Minutes, winning two Gemini Awards and a Writers Guild of Canada award for his work with that show's writing team, and was one of the writers of the 1997 film Hayseed.

In 1998, Bellini made an autobiographical documentary, Bellini's Drive, which among other things explained his thoughts on being the second-most famous person from Timmins — the first being Shania Twain. In the same year, he and Thompson coauthored Buddy Babylon, the comedic autobiography of Thompson's Kids in the Hall character Buddy Cole.

Bellini, who is gay, was later a columnist for fab, a gay magazine in Toronto. In 2012 he self-published The Fab Columns, a compilation of his writing for the magazine, and performed at Awkward, a storytelling event about embarrassing experiences at Buddies in Bad Times which also featured Maggie Cassella, Marco Bernardi, Andrew Johnston, Rob Salerno, Dawn Whitwell, Shawn Hitchins and Gavin Crawford.

In the same era, he was also a radio host on Toronto's CIRR-FM.

In 2015, Bellini and Thompson uploaded all of their Mouth Congress recordings to Bandcamp, and they reunited the following year for several live shows to promote the release. They launched a successful Kickstarter campaign to fund a documentary film about the band; the film, Mouth Congress, premiered at the Kingston Canadian Film Festival in 2021.

In October 2019, Bellini was admitted to intensive care after suffering complications from hernia surgery. A crowdfunding campaign was launched to assist with his medical costs, which reached the $30,000 goal in just two days after it was promoted on Twitter by all of the Kids in the Hall. He was in intensive care but did recover.

Writing credits 
 The Kids in the Hall, writer for four seasons; also featured on several episodes (clad in a towel)
 Out There in Hollywood on Comedy Central
 Writer for This Hour Has 22 Minutes 1994-1997
 Buddy Babylon, The Autobiography of Buddy Cole, a 1998 humor novel written with Scott Thompson, 
 LockerRoom on PrideVision, a gay sketch comedy series: co-producer and writer, and host of the segment Coach's Corner.
 Writer for television specials Jest in Time for Halloween and Out There in TV
 Yvon of the Yukon, 2000, staff writer
 Made in Canada, 1998, writer
 Hayseed, writer
 DoUlike2watch.com, 2003, writer
 Futz!, story editor

Film and television appearances 
Candles, Snow, Mistletoe - by Sharon, Lois and Bram
Behind the Scenes - The Comedy Network
Kids in the Hall: Brain Candy (1996)
Hayseed (1997)-- independent film
Bellini's Drive (1998)
Kids in the Hall: Death Comes to Town (2010)

Awards 
 Won Gemini Award in 1996, 1997 - writer for This Hour Has 22 Minutes
 Won Writer's Guide of Canada for Excellence in Writing in 1997 for This Hour Has 22 Minutes
 Nominated Emmy Award 1993, 1994, 1995 - writer for The Kids in the Hall
 Nominated Cable ACE award 1992 - writer for The Kids in the Hall

References

External links 
 

1959 births
20th-century Canadian comedians
21st-century Canadian comedians
Living people
Male actors from Ontario
Canadian humour columnists
Canadian punk rock musicians
Canadian television personalities
Canadian radio hosts
Canadian gay actors
Canadian gay writers
Canadian gay musicians
The Kids in the Hall
Canadian LGBT broadcasters
Gay comedians
Canadian television writers
Canadian sketch comedians
Writers from Timmins
Canadian male television writers
Canadian Screen Award winners
20th-century Canadian screenwriters
21st-century Canadian screenwriters
Canadian male screenwriters
Comedians from Ontario
Canadian LGBT comedians
Gay screenwriters
21st-century Canadian LGBT people
20th-century Canadian LGBT people